Xia Deren (born June 1955) is a Chinese politician. Since 2003, he has served as the Chairman of the People's Political Consultative Conference of Liaoning Province. He previously was  Deputy Communist Party Secretary of Liaoning province, and the Party Secretary of Dalian.

Major academic works
 Economic Development and Money Supply (published by China Financial Publishing House in 1992)
 Money and Banking (a textbook used by the People’s Bank of China for the Ninth Five-Year Plan; published by China Financial Publishing House)
 Finance Review (Published by Dongbei University of Finance and Economics Press in March 1998)

Honorable mentions
Rowan Callick, in the book, The Party Forever, inside China's Modern Communist Elite, Chapter 9 : Doing Business, interviews Xia Deren about business development in Dalian, China

Thomas L. Friedman, in the book, The World Is Flat, chapter 1: While I was sleeping, section: The monitor is burning, interviews Xia Deren about education, Japanese corporations, and software development in Dalian, China.

External links
Official resume
官方简历 (Chinese language official resume)

References

1955 births
Living people
People's Republic of China politicians from Liaoning
Mayors of Dalian
Chinese Communist Party politicians from Liaoning
Politicians from Dalian
Dongbei University of Finance and Economics alumni
Academic staff of Dongbei University of Finance and Economics
Educators from Liaoning